SJAC may refer to:
 St. John Ambulance Canada, the Canadian chapter of St. John Ambulance, a first aid training organization
 Stonewall Jackson Area Council, a local council of the Boy Scouts of America, a youth organization, in Virginia and West Virginia, USA